Odell Hill is a summit in the U.S. state of New York.

Odell Hill was named in 1790 after Simeon Odell.

References

Mountains of Rensselaer County, New York
Hills of New York (state)